The Ray Miron President's Cup is a trophy that was awarded to the playoff champion of the Central Hockey League (CHL) from 2002 until 2014, when the remaining CHL teams joined the ECHL. The trophy was known as The William "Bill" Levins Memorial Cup from 1992 until 2000, when the honour was renamed the Ray Miron Cup. (Bill Levins and Ray Miron being the co-founders of the CHL). From 1997-2001, the WPHL's playoff champion was awarded the "President's Cup", so when the CHL and the Western Professional Hockey League merged following their 2000-01 seasons, the CHL combined the traditions of the two leagues by renaming the trophy the "Ray Miron President's Cup".

The "Playoff Most Valuable Player" award was also given out as part of the Ray Miron President's Cup Championship ceremonies. Ron Handy is the only player to win the award on multiple occasions.

14 different franchises won the CHL Championship, with six of them (Wichita, Oklahoma City, Memphis/Mississippi, Laredo, Colorado and Allen) winning twice. The five franchises hold the record for most championships won with two. Current possession of the trophy belongs to the Allen Americans, who won it in 2014 with a 4-1 victory over the Denver Cutthroats becoming only the third CHL team to win back-to-back championships.

List of Central Hockey League Champions

External links 
Intotheboards.net Playoffs

Awards established in 2002
Central Hockey League trophies and awards
2002 establishments in the United States